Aswad is a male Arabic given name that means "black" (also used for people of black complexion).

People named Aswad include:
Aswad ibn Yazid, narrator of hadith

People using it in their patronymic include:
Miqdad ibn Aswad, companion of the Islamic prophet, Muhammad
Ziad Abderrazzak Mohammad Aswad, former government minister in Iraq

Other uses
Other uses of the word include:
Al-Abd Al-Aswad, a form of torture noted in Syria
Hajarul Aswad, the Black Stone at the Kaaba in Mecca
Aswad, British reggae group
 Association for the Study of the Worldwide African Diaspora (ASWAD)
 أيلول الأسود (aylūl al-aswad), Black September.

See also
Arabic name

References